Burundi competed at the 2014 Summer Youth Olympics, in Nanjing, China from 16 August to 28 August 2014.

Medalists

Medals awarded to participants of mixed-NOC (Combined) teams are represented in italics. These medals are not counted towards the individual NOC medal tally.

Athletics

Burundi qualified five athletes.

Qualification Legend: Q=Final A (medal); qB=Final B (non-medal); qC=Final C (non-medal); qD=Final D (non-medal); qE=Final E (non-medal)

Boys
Track & road events

Girls
Track & road events

Beach Volleyball

Burundi qualified a boys' team by their performance at the CAVB Qualification Tournament.

Tennis

Burundi qualified one athlete based on the 9 June 2014 ITF World Junior Rankings.

Singles

Doubles

References

You
Nations at the 2014 Summer Youth Olympics
Burundi at the Youth Olympics